Oswego Junior Senior High School is a public co-educational school in Oswego, Kansas serving students in grades 7-12. The school is part of the Oswego USD 504 school district.

History
The former Oswego High School moved to this site in 1994 from an historic 1921 building near uptown Oswego. Following the high school's move, the former Oswego Junior High School moved from the former Westside School attendance center into the high school's former building and became Oswego Middle School, serving grades 6-8.

In 2015, Oswego USD 504 completed a large expansion at the Tomahawk Trail campus, and combined the two attendance centers, creating Oswego Junior Senior High School. Sixth grade students returned to the Neosho Heights Elementary School attendance center.

Academics

Oswego High School was honored in 2011 by the United States Department of Education as part of the National Blue Ribbon Schools Program. The Blue Ribbon Award recognizes public and private schools which perform at high levels or have made significant academic improvements. U.S. News & World Report has repeatedly recognized Oswego High School in its national rankings with a bronze medal, ranking the school as one of the best schools in Kansas and the United States for college preparation and state assessment proficiency.

Athletics
Oswego High School fields athletic teams in baseball, basketball, cheerleading, cross country, football, golf, softball, track and field, and volleyball.

Oswego Junior High School teams include basketball, cheerleading, football, track and field, and volleyball. Both schools have a pep band for football and basketball games.

Arts
The campus offers programs in concert band, concert choir, photography, theatre, and the visual arts.

See also

 List of high schools in Kansas
 List of unified school districts in Kansas

References

External links
 

Public high schools in Kansas
Public middle schools in Kansas
Buildings and structures in Oswego, Kansas
1921 establishments in Kansas